"Death Ship" is an episode of the American television anthology series The Twilight Zone, based on a 1953 short story with the same title by Richard Matheson. The story was inspired by the legend of the Flying Dutchman. In this episode, a spaceship crew discovers a wrecked replica of their ship with their own dead bodies inside.

Opening narration

Plot
The Space Cruiser E-89, crewed by Captain Paul Ross, Lt. Ted Mason, and Lt. Mike Carter, is on a mission to analyze new worlds and discover if they are suitable for colonization. While orbiting a planet, Mason sees a metallic glint in the landscape. He conjects that this might be a sign of alien life, but the pragmatic Captain Ross disagrees. Nevertheless, the Cruiser prepares to land next to the mysterious object.

After landing, the men find that the gleaming comes from the wreck of a ship exactly like their own. Inside the craft, they discover their own lifeless bodies. Mason and Carter go numb with shock. Ross, struggling for an explanation, decides they have bent time in such a way as to get a glimpse of the future. He says to avoid their fate they must refrain from taking off again. Mason and Carter fiercely object to this plan, especially once they find that atmospheric interference prevents their contacting anyone for help, and that the frigid night-time temperatures of the planet will force them to rapidly exhaust the ship's energy reserves on heat. Ross pulls rank to make them comply.

While looking out the viewport, Carter is transported back to a country lane on Earth. There, he encounters people from his past. He runs to the house that his wife and he  shared, and finds it empty except for a telegram notifying her that he has died in the line of duty. Carter is wrenched from his vision by Ross; as Carter describes what he has just experienced, he realizes that the people he encountered are dead. Ross insists it was a delusion. The two then find Mason has vanished. He is having an emotional reunion with his wife and child. When Ross pulls him back, Mason is enraged and wants to be allowed back, maintaining that his encounter with his family was real. From Mason's pocket, Ross pulls a newspaper clipping about the death of Mason's wife and child. The captain then posits a new theory about what is going on: The planet is inhabited by telepathic aliens who are using illusions to keep them from reporting back to Earth, thus averting colonization of their home. Ross says that if they take the E-89 back up to space, that should break the spell.

The men take E-89 back in orbit. Mason and Carter admit that Ross may have been right about the aliens. Ross then insists on landing the craft again to gather foreign samples to bring back to Earth. When they land again, the wreck of their craft is still present. The successive disproving of Ross's theories, combined with an intuitive knowledge of their condition, brings Mason and Carter to the realization that they already crashed and are dead. Their afterlife visits were real, and  their current situation  is the illusion. Ross refuses to accept this. He rejects his crew's pleas to be allowed to embrace their deaths and be reunited with their loved ones, and says that they will "go over it again and again" until he figures out an alternative explanation.

In compliance with Ross's order, the men are returned to the moment where Mason first spotted the E-89's wreckage, doomed to relive the past several hours of investigation over and over.

Closing narration

Production notes
The model of the hovering spaceship is that of a C-57D Cruiser, a leftover prop from MGM's 1956 film Forbidden Planet. The crashed ship was a realistically painted model/set.  The prop was also used in the 1960 Twilight Zone episodes "The Monsters Are Due on Maple Street" and "Third from the Sun".

A crew member shirt, also used in the episode "On Thursday We Leave for Home", was offered at auction in late September 2015 by Profiles in History with an estimated value of $1,000 to $1,500, with a winning bid of $1,600 by Mathew G. Perrone, a private collector.

Cast

 Jack Klugman as Capt. Paul Ross
 Ross Martin as Lt. Ted Mason
 Fred Beir (as Fredrick Beir) as Lt. Mike Carter
 Mary Webster as Ruth Mason
 Ross Elliott as Kramer
 Sara Taft as Mrs. Nolan
 Tammy Marihugh as Jeannie Mason

References

DeVoe, Bill. (2008). Trivia from The Twilight Zone. Albany, GA: Bear Manor Media. 
Grams, Martin. (2008). The Twilight Zone: Unlocking the Door to a Television Classic. Churchville, MD: OTR Publishing.

External links

1963 American television episodes
Fiction set in 1997
Adaptations of works by Richard Matheson
Television episodes written by Richard Matheson
The Twilight Zone (1959 TV series season 4) episodes
Television shows based on short fiction
Works about astronauts